Zombie Planet is a 2004 American horror film directed and written by George Bonilla.  Frank Farhat stars as a zombie hunter in a post-apocalyptic world. The film also stars Christopher Rose, Matt Perry, Rebecca Minton, and Karl Gustav Lindstrom.

Premise 
After a pharmaceutical company develops a new wonder drug, its customers turn into zombies.  T. K. Kane, a mysterious outsider, arrives in a community terrorized by local warlord Adam.  Kane protects the community and hunts down the zombies plaguing the community.

Cast 
 Frank Farhat as T. K. Kane
 Christopher Rose as Warren
 Matthew Perry as Adam
 Rebecca Minton as Julie
 Karl Gustav Lindstrom as Frank
 Jon Shelton as Stiletto
 Fran Rabe as Mary
 Rhonda Barker as Rose

Production 
Director George Bonilla was inspired to make a zombie film after moving to Kentucky and finding a supportive independent film community there.  Bonilla believed that zombies created from a defective drug would allow for a wide variety of effects on people, and allowed him to write in both feral and intelligent zombies.  The cast and crew were mainly made up of people with no experience in filmmaking.  Scenes were shot at the Bluegrass Aspendale housing project in Lexington, Kentucky.  Bonilla's wife Tammy is the executive producer.

Release 
Zombie Planet was distributed by J. R. Bookwalter's Tempe Entertainment.  It was released on DVD on October 19, 2004.

Reception 
Peter Dendle called the film "epically awful" and embarrassing for Lexington natives.  David Johnson of DVD Verdict said that the film is better than most Z movies, but its length leads to too much filler.  Bill Gibron of DVD Talk rated the film 3/5 stars and said that "there are kernels of creativity and outright cleverness in this big, sloppy ersatz-spectacle."

References

External links 
 

2004 films
2004 horror films
2000s science fiction horror films
American independent films
American zombie films
American post-apocalyptic films
Films shot in Kentucky
Films set in Kentucky
2000s English-language films
2000s American films